Robert Sulewski (born 7 February 1994) is a Polish professional footballer who plays as a defender for III liga club Cartusia Kartuzy.

Career
In February 2019, Sulewski was demoted to the reserve team of Arka Gdynia and was told to find a new club. He left the club in the summer 2019 and then joined Concordia Elbląg in October, before signing with Sokół Ostróda on 14 January 2020.

References

External links

1994 births
Living people
Polish footballers
Association football defenders
Arka Gdynia players
Stal Mielec players
Zagłębie Sosnowiec players
Cartusia Kartuzy players
Ekstraklasa players
I liga players
II liga players
III liga players